is a former Japanese football player.

Playing career
Kenya Maeshiro played for FC Ryukyu from 2013 to 2014.

References

External links

1995 births
Living people
Association football people from Okinawa Prefecture
Japanese footballers
J3 League players
Japan Football League players
FC Ryukyu players
Association football forwards